Benjamin Bennet (October 31, 1764 – October 8, 1840) was a slave owner and  U.S. Representative from New Jersey.

Born in Bucks County in the Province of Pennsylvania, Bennet attended the common schools.
He studied theology, was ordained as a minister in Middletown Township, New Jersey in 1793, and served as pastor of a Baptist church in that city. He also engaged in agricultural pursuits.

Bennet was elected as a Democratic-Republican to the Fourteenth and Fifteenth Congresses (March 4, 1815 – March 3, 1819). After his time in office, he resumed agricultural pursuits.
He died on his farm near Middletown Township on October 8, 1840, and was interred in the Baptist Cemetery, Holmdel Township, New Jersey.

References

1764 births
1840 deaths
People from Bucks County, Pennsylvania
People from Middletown Township, New Jersey
18th-century Baptist ministers from the United States
Democratic-Republican Party members of the United States House of Representatives from New Jersey